Live at Watkins Glen is a 1995 album by the Band, presented by Capitol Records as a live album from the Summer Jam at Watkins Glen rock festival held outside Watkins Glen, New York, on July 28, 1973 in front of 600,000 people. Garth Hudson's organ solo, "Too Wet to Work", and the plainly titled "Jam" come from the actual Watkins Glen concert, as does the introduction of the group by Bill Graham. The former track appears on the out-of-print 1994 box set Across the Great Divide, but the latter track is only present on the Watkins Glen disc. The remainder of the tracks are two studio outtakes with overdubbed crowd noise, "Back to Memphis" and "Endless Highway", plus five tracks from the Academy of Music shows in December 1971 and "Don't Ya Tell Henry" from the Woodstock festival in 1969. The two studio outtakes are available on the 2001 re-release of Moondog Matinee, without the crowd overdubs. The Academy of Music tracks are available on the 2001 two-CD re-release of Rock of Ages as "previously unavailable" tracks.

The album was originally prepared by the Band in 1973 and was supposed to be released in 1974 under the title Is Everybody Wet? but its release was cancelled.

Track listing

Personnel
The Band
Rick Danko – bass, vocals
Levon Helm – drums, mandolin, vocals
Garth Hudson – organ, clavinet
Richard Manuel – piano, drums, clavinet, vocals
Robbie Robertson – guitars

Additional personnel
Wayne Watkins – reissue producer

References

1995 live albums
Capitol Records live albums
The Band live albums